Small plates is a manner of dining that became popular in US food service after 2000. Small plates may either refer to small dishes resembling appetizers which are ordered à la carte and often shared, such as tapas, or to the small courses served as part of a more formal meal.

Types
Some types of small plates which have influenced the modern US concept are:

 Tapas, a wide variety of appetizers in Spanish cuisine
 Mezze, a wide variety of appetizers in Turkish cuisine, and sometimes in Greek cuisine
 Antipasti and cicchetti in Italian cuisine
 Banchan, in Korean cuisine
 Sozai, the small and usually shared dishes served at an izakaya, a Japanese pub
 The pu pu platter of Hawaiian cuisine
 Zakuski in Russian cuisine
 Side dish in Chinese cuisine

References

Appetizers
Serving and dining